The 1957–58 season was the fifty-sixth season in which Dundee competed at a Scottish national level, playing in Division One, where the club would finish in 11th place. Dundee would also compete in both the Scottish Cup and the Scottish League Cup. They would be knocked out in the group stage of the League Cup, and in the third round of the Scottish Cup by Aberdeen. The club would change their sock colours back to navy, cementing their iconic look for the next decade.

Scottish Division One 

Statistics provided by Dee Archive.

League table

Scottish League Cup 

Statistics provided by Dee Archive.

Group 4

Group 4 table

Scottish Cup 

Statistics provided by Dee Archive.

Player Statistics 
Statistics provided by Dee Archive

|}

See also 

 List of Dundee F.C. seasons

References

External links 

 1957-58 Dundee season on Fitbastats

Dundee F.C. seasons
Dundee